Geoffrey Stephen Hamilton (15 August 1936 – 4 August 1996) was an English gardener, broadcaster and author, best known as presenter of BBC television's Gardeners' World in the 1980s and 1990s.

Background
Hamilton was born just a few minutes before his twin brother Tony, in Stepney, London. His family moved to Broxbourne in Hertfordshire when he was two, and his interest in horticulture was nurtured initially by working on the family's back garden. He expanded his knowledge still further by helping out at local nurseries during the school holidays – mainly at the Van Hage nursery at the end of his road. He went on to Writtle Agricultural College in Essex where, in 1959, he passed the National Diploma in Horticulture with distinction.

After graduating from agricultural college he became a nurseryman and self-employed landscape gardener, then opened his own garden centre ("The Hamilton Garden Centre") on the outskirts of Kettering in Northamptonshire. He began writing a column for Garden News in 1970, and in 1975 became a full-time journalist when he took over as editor of Practical Gardening magazine, where he began his crusade to inform everybody about the joys and benefits of organic gardening.

Television and Barnsdale
Hamilton got his first break into television in 1970 presenting Gardening Diary for Anglia TV which led to guest appearances on BBC1's Gardeners' World. From 1979 until his death, he was the show's regular, and longest-serving presenter, and, in 1985, was responsible for moving the show's venue to his own garden at Barnsdale, Rutland.  He was also the creator of several other BBC television gardening series such as The Cottage Garden, The Paradise Garden and The Ornamental Kitchen Garden. Hamilton wrote or co-wrote a number of books to accompany his television series (see below).

His practical hands-on experience, down-to-earth, cost-saving approach to gardening, his desire to share his failures as well as successes with the audience, combined with a gentle humour were some of the keys to his success and popularity. He was a committed and informed early advocate of the organic approach to gardening, helping to dispel the rather widely held belief that organic gardening was slightly odd and 'cranky.'

Readers of Amateur Gardening magazine nominated Hamilton as Gardener of the Millennium. It has remained a puzzle to many in the gardening world that despite his achievements and popularity, he received neither award nor recognition from the Royal Horticultural Society. He was, however, awarded an honorary Master of Science Degree by Anglia Polytechnic University in 1994.

Death and legacy
Hamilton suffered a heart attack in 1995, and took three months off work to recuperate. He died after suffering a heart attack on a charity bike ride near Merthyr Tydfil, Wales, in August 1996. He was buried at St Peter and St Paul Churchyard in Exton, Rutland.

A charity, Geoff Hamilton's New Gardeners' Foundation, was set up to provide a bursary of £4,000 for students of any age and level studying practical horticulture at Writtle College. This award is funded by donations and sales of gardening DVDs.

Bibliography

Written or co-authored by Hamilton

Do Your Own Garden Stonework (W Foulsham & Company Limited, 1986).
The Living Garden (BBC books, 1992).
Geoff Hamilton's Cottage Gardens (BBC books, 1995).
The Ornamental Kitchen Garden (BBC books, 1995).
Search, Gay. Old Garden, New Gardener  (BBC books, 1995)
Search, Gay. The Complete First Time Gardener (BBC books, 1996)
Geoff Hamilton's Paradise Gardens (BBC books, 1997).
Clevely, A & Hamilton, L. Geoff Hamilton's Year in Your Garden (Headline Book Publishing, 1998)
"Gardeners' World" Practical Gardening Course (BBC books, 2000).
Organic Gardening (Dorling Kindersley, 2008).

About Hamilton

Search, Gay & Hamilton, Tony. Geoff Hamilton: A Man and His Garden" (BBC books, 1998).
Hamilton, Tony. Geoff Hamilton: The Complete Gardener (Headline Book Publishing, 2000)
Hamilton, Tony. My Brother Geoff: The People's Gardener (Headline Book publishing, 2001)
Hamilton, Nick & Sue. Geoff Hamilton: A Gardening Legend (2006).

References

External links
Geoff Hamilton biog (Barnsdale gardens)
Geoff Hamilton – a gardening legend
Geoff Hamilton – an "English rose" by David C.H. Austin

English gardeners
English garden writers
English television presenters
People from Stepney
1936 births
1996 deaths